The Long Haul is a 1957 British drama film directed by Ken Hughes and starring Victor Mature, Patrick Allen and Diana Dors.

Plot

An American ex-serviceman leaves Allied-occupied Germany after World War II and is persuaded by his English wife to settle in Liverpool. Looking for work, he becomes a lorry driver. He comes into contact with criminals involved in theft from commercial vehicles and draws close to the girlfriend of a major crime figure.

Cast

 Victor Mature as  Harry Miller 
 Diana Dors as  Lynn
 Patrick Allen as  Joe Easy
 Gene Anderson as Connie Miller
 Peter Reynolds as  Frank
 Liam Redmond as  Casey
 John Welsh as  Doctor
 Meier Tzelniker as Nat Fine
 Michael Wade as  Butch Miller 
 Dervis Ward as  Mutt 
 Murray Kash as  Jeff 
 Jameson Clark as  MacNaughton 
 John Harvey as  Superintendent Macrea 
 Roland Brand as  Army sergeant 
 Stanley Rose as  Foreman 
 Barry Raymond as  Depot manager
 Norman Rossington as Liverpool driver
 Arthur Mullard as Minor role
 Alfred Burke as drunk in Club (uncredited)
 Sam Kydd as Taxi Driver
 Madge Brindley as Café Proprietress

Original novel
The film was based on the novel by Mervyn Mills, published in 1956. It was Mills' first novel. According to his obituary, the novel "stemmed from his journeys through early post-war Britain on a moped, before the advent of the motorways, when he absorbed, on the Great North Road, something of the lives of the long-distance lorry drivers, their roadside cafes and the people, often women, who frequented them. The book was turned down by 12 publishers, then accepted by the 13th, and even then Mills had to fight for his artistic integrity with the director and general editor Lovat Dickson to retain the more colourful passages. After so many rejections, this took courage."

The Irish Times called it "an exciting and unusually vivid book."

Development
Film rights were bought by Todon Productions, the film company of Tony Owen and Donna Reed, run by Maxwell Seton. Ken Hughes, who had made films for them before, signed to write and direct.

In July 1956 Diana Dors agreed to play the female lead. Like many Todon films, it was distributed through Columbia. The production was credited to Seton's company, Marksman Films. Columbia were financing a number of films in Britain at the time.

Robert Mitchum originally was announced as the male star. In January 1957 Victor Mature signed. Mature had just made three films in England for Warwick Productions, which also distributed through Columbia: Zarak, Safari and Interpol. Mature had driven trucks for his father's business when younger.

Setton tried to get Raymond Burr to support Mature and Dors but was unable to secure him. A lead role was played by newcomer Patrick Allen whom Setton signed to a three-picture contract over three years.

Production
Filming started 18 February and took place at British Lion studios in Shepperton. There was location filming in the Scottish Highlands.

Critical reception
Leonard Maltin dismissed the film as "Minor fare"; whereas DVD Talk commended a "Completely satisfying British B-noir. Sure the story is familiar, but it's handled with cold, professional skill. The performers are perfectly cast here. I'm highly recommending The Long Haul."

Filmink called it "a decent little movie, and Dors was as beautiful and warm as ever, reminding everyone what she was capable of."

Alternative Title
In Spain, the original poster gave it the title 'El Precio de un Hombre', 'The Price of a Man'.

See also
 List of American films of 1957

References

External links

The Long Haul at BFI

1957 films
1957 crime drama films
British crime drama films
Films directed by Ken Hughes
Films set in Glasgow
Films set in England
Films set in Liverpool
Columbia Pictures films
Trucker films
1950s English-language films
1950s British films